Lake Wenatchee is a glacier- and snowmelt-fed lake situated in the Wenatchee National Forest on the eastern slopes of the Cascades Mountain Range in the state of Washington. Lake Wenatchee is the source of the Wenatchee River. Its main tributaries are the White River and the Little Wenatchee River. At its eastern end, the lake is breasted by Lake Wenatchee State Park. Lake Wenatchee State Airport, an unimproved grass and dirt landing strip, is adjacent to the north side of the state park.

References

External links

Lake Wenatchee Washington Department of Fish and Wildlife
Lake Wenatchee Info

Wenatchee
Wenatchee
North Cascades of Washington (state)
Tourist attractions in Chelan County, Washington